Through the Glass is a 2008 American-Nigerian comedy film, written, directed and produced by Stephanie Okereke. The film was nominated for Best Screenplay at the 5th Africa Movie Academy Awards in 2009.

Premise
The film tells the story of Jeffrey (Garrett McKechnie), who finds himself stuck with an unknown baby. He then ask his Nigerian neighbour (Stephanie Okereke) for help. He has to find the mother of the child before his life is completely ruined.

Cast
Garrett McKechnie as Jeffery
Stephanie Okereke as Ada
Christy Williams as Nicole
Pascal Atuma as Lawyer Robert
Susy Dodson as Mrs Lucas
Dana Hanna as Gina

See also
 List of Nigerian films of 2008

References

External links
 

2008 films
2008 comedy films
Nigerian comedy films
American comedy films
English-language Nigerian films
2000s English-language films
2000s American films